Joseph Donald Looney (born August 31, 1990) is a former American football center. He was drafted by the San Francisco 49ers in the fourth round of the 2012 NFL Draft. He played college football at Wake Forest University.

Early years 
Looney was raised in Lake Worth, Florida.  At the age of six, he already weighed 120 pounds, so he had to play football with boys who were as much as twice his age.

He attended Lake Worth Community High School, where he was a four-year starter at offensive tackle. He was named second-team all-state as a junior. He received All-Palm Beach County and All-state Class 6A honors as a senior in 2008.

College career 
Looney accepted a football scholarship from Wake Forest University. As a true freshman, he became a starter at left guard in the seventh game against the University of Miami, after Trey Bailey broke his ankle against the University of Maryland and Russell Nenon was moved from left guard to center.

As a sophomore, he started 11 out of 12 games at left guard. The next year he started 10 games at left guard, missing 2 contests while recovering from a sprained ankle.

As a senior, he started all 13 games at left guard. He finished his college career with 41 starts out of 48 games over four years. He received a late invitation to play in the Senior Bowl, but he suffered a foot injury during practice, and was unable to participate in the NFL Combine or Wake Forest's pro day.

Professional career

San Francisco 49ers
Looney was selected by the San Francisco 49ers in the fourth round (117th overall) of the 2012 NFL Draft, after trading a sixth round pick (#196-Jonte Green) to the Detroit Lions in order to move up 8 slots. As a rookie, he spent the entire season on the inactive list.

In 2013, he appeared in 4 games as a backup and was inactive for 12 contests and all 3 playoff games.

In 2014, he appeared in 15 games with 4 starts, including 2 starts at right guard, one at center and one at left guard, helping the offense finish fourth in the NFL in rushing with 2,176 yards. He was released on September 4, 2015.

Tennessee Titans
On October 20, 2015, Looney was signed by the Tennessee Titans for depth purposes, after center Brian Schwenke was placed on the injured reserve list. He appeared in 8 games with 6 starts (3 at center and 3 at left guard). He dressed but did not play in 3 games.

Dallas Cowboys

On March 29, 2016, the Dallas Cowboys signed Looney as a free agent to a two-year contract, to replace the recently departed Mackenzy Bernadeau, as a versatile backup that could play any of the interior positions along the offensive line. He replaced an injured Ronald Leary at left guard in the fourth quarter against the Cleveland Browns. After Geoff Swaim was injured against the Pittsburgh Steelers, he began to be used as a blocking tight end in short yardage situations. He helped rookie running back Ezekiel Elliott become the rushing NFL leader and was one of the offensive linemen that Elliott gave an ATV as a gift at the end of the season.

In 2017, he appeared in all 16 games as a backup. On March 26, 2018, Looney re-signed with the Cowboys on a two-year contract.

In 2018, Looney was named the starting center for all 16 games after Travis Frederick was diagnosed with Guillain–Barré syndrome and missed the entire season.

In 2019, he returned to a reserve role after Frederick regained his health and his starting job. He appeared in 16 games with one start at center in the season finale against the Washington Redskins.

On March 19, 2020, Looney re-signed with the Cowboys. He was named the starting center following the retirement of Frederick. He suffered a sprained MCL in Week 4 and was placed on injured reserve on October 10, 2020. He was activated on October 31. He appeared in 13 games with 12 starts at center and was replaced with rookie Tyler Biadasz while he was out. He wasn't re-signed after the season.

New York Giants
On July 31, 2021, Looney signed with the New York Giants. He announced his retirement from the NFL on August 4.

Personal life
Looney's younger brother James, was a notable player at Lake Worth Community High School and also decided to attend Wake Forest, before transferring to the University of California. He was a member of the Green Bay Packers' practice squad. Their father played college football at the University of Louisville.

References

External links 
 Wake Forest Demon Deacons bio
 "My Football Journey" Wake Forest interview (December 5, 2011)

1990 births
Living people
American football centers
American football offensive guards
Dallas Cowboys players
New York Giants players
People from Lake Worth Beach, Florida
Players of American football from Florida
San Francisco 49ers players
Sportspeople from the Miami metropolitan area
Tennessee Titans players
Wake Forest Demon Deacons football players